Zahida Hina (Urdu: زاہدہ حنا) is a noted Urdu columnist, essayist, short story writer, novelist and dramatist from Pakistan.

Life 
Zahida was born in India, after the independence of Pakistan in 1947, her father, Muhammad Abul Khair, emigrated to Pakistan and settled in Karachi, where Zahida was brought up and homeschooled until she started her formal education from 7th class at Happy Home School. She wrote her first story when she was nine years old. She graduated from University of Karachi, and her first essay was published in the monthly Insha in 1962. She chose journalism as a career in mid-60s. In 1970, she married the well-known poet Jaun Elia. Zahida Hina was associated with the daily Jang from 1988 until 2005 when she moved to the Daily Express, Pakistan. She now lives in Karachi. Hina has also worked for Radio Pakistan, BBC Urdu and Voice of America.

Since 2006, she has written a weekly column, Pakistan Diary in Rasrang, the Sunday magazine of India's largest read Hindi newspaper, Dainik Bhaskar.

Work
Zahida Hina has written more than two thousand journalistic articles. Many of her short stories have been translated into English, Bengali, Hindi and Marathi. Some of her important titles are:

 Qaidi sans leta hai (collection of short stories)
 Titlian dhondhne wali   (collections of stories)
 Raqs-i-bismil hai        (collections of stories)
 Rah main ajal hai (collection of short stories)
 Na junoon raha na pari rahi (short novel)
 Dard ka Shajar (Novel)
 Dard-e-Ashob (Novel)
 Zard Paton ka ban (TV Drama)
 The House of Loneliness (Zahida Hina's short stories translated into English)

She is a known critic of nuclear technology for any purpose (military or civilian).

Her books have been translated into English by Faiz Ahmed Faiz, Samina Rahman and Muhammad Umar Memon.

Awards 
 Faiz Award
 Literary Performance Award
 Saghir Siddiqui Adabi Award
 K. P. Award
 Sindh Speaker Award
 SAARC Literary Award in 2001 by the President of India

In August 2006, she was nominated for Pakistan's highest award, the Presidential Award Pride of Performance, which she declined as a mark of protest against the military government in Pakistan

References

Living people
Pakistani people of Bihari descent
Pakistani feminist writers
Pakistani columnists
Pakistani women journalists
Pakistani television writers
University of Karachi alumni
Journalists from Karachi
Writers from Karachi
Urdu-language essayists
Urdu-language columnists
Urdu-language dramatists and playwrights
Pakistani dramatists and playwrights
20th-century Urdu-language writers
Urdu-language women writers
Urdu-language novelists
Year of birth missing (living people)
Pakistani women novelists
Pakistani novelists
20th-century Pakistani women writers
20th-century Pakistani writers
21st-century Pakistani women writers
21st-century Pakistani writers
Women television writers
Pakistani women columnists